The Musée des ondes Emile Berliner is located in the historic factory of the Berliner Gram-o-phone Company in Montreal, Quebec, Canada. The museum is a technical history Museum about the development of music recording and subsequent industries. For the project to celebrate the Centennial of Broadcasting in Canada the museum received the Governor General History Award in 2020.

Building and museum 
The factory was since its construction in 1907 until 1924 the world headquarters of the Berliner Gramophone Company. Emil Berliner was the inventor of the flat record with a lateral cut.

Emile Berliner moved his company from Philadelphia in the United States to Montreal, Canada in 1900, after a legal battle surrounding the use of Berliner's trade name "Gramophone," withdrew his right to this trade name in the USA. He built his first own factory for the Berliner Gram-O-Phone Co. Montreal in 1907 on a property in Saint Henri, Montreal.

After 1929, the factory became part of RCA Victor Canada. At the end of the 1950s, the first Canadian Satellite, the Alouette 1, was finalized here.

The MOEB was founded in 1992 by five Montreal citizens inside of the former record factory in Saint Henri. Since 1996, the museum creates yearly temporary exhibitions. In 2019 the museum added a permanent exhibition. The collection of the museum consists of approximately 30.000 objects. Besides a large collection of locally produced shellac records, the museum holds objects related to recording technology, broadcasting technology, different recording media and also objects related to the development of satellites. The objects date from the pioneering time of the music industry until the time of digitization.

A weekly workshop for retired sound engineers, record collectors, historians, engineers, etc. takes place since 2006, known as the Club des vieilles lampes.

Around 1990, after RCA Victor had moved to a now location in Sainte-Anne-de-Bellevue, the building, known today as „Édifice RCA“ was converted to a mixed use office complex The museum distributed several showcases throughout the building.

Exhibitions 
 From the gramophone to the satellite (1996)
 Happy birthday Nipper… an exhibition with a 100 year bite (2000)
 The Audio Chain (2002)
 50 Years of Television in Montreal (2003)
 Marconi (2004)
 Montreal, the Cradle of the Recording Industry (2008)
 Goodbye Broadway, Hello Montréal (2010)
 Montreal radio in Wartime (2015)
 Montreal in Space (2016)
 Design Montreal RCA (2017)
 100 years of radio broadcasting in Montreal (2019)
 Herbert S. Berliner: Building the Canadian Recording Industry (2022)

Publications 
Early Radio Innovation in Canada, Canadian Marconi Company (1895-1938), by Denis Couillard. Bilingual, French and English, 2020, ISBN 978-1-7770988-0-3,

References

External links
 website of the museum
 Société des musées du Québec
 La grande histoire du son à Montréal au Musée des ondes Émile Berliner
 Preserving St-Henri's history of sound: Musée des ondes Emile Berliner located in former RCA Victor factory 
 Artefacts Canada, Collection Musée des ondes Emile Berliner
 Émile Berliner et la RCA Victor
 Parcours les pionniers de la radiodiffusion

Music museums
History museums in Quebec
Technology museums in Canada
Museums in Montreal
Manufacturing buildings and structures